Tour Initiale (previously known as tour Nobel) is an office building located in La Défense business district just west of Paris, France. The 105 m (344 ft) Tour Initiale was the first office tower built in the La Défense district with its construction being completed in 1966. In 1988, the tower was given an internal renovation, and the new name of Tour Initiale.

The Tour Initiale was designed by architects Jean de Mailly and Jacques Depussé and engineer Jean Prouvé who designed the building's glass facade. The tower uses curved glass on the building's corners, which, at the time of construction, was generally unknown in France and the glass had to be imported from the United States.

See also
 Skyscraper
 La Défense
 List of tallest structures in Paris

External links
 Official Site
Emporis Buildings, Tour Initiale

Initiale
Initiale
Office buildings completed in 1966
20th-century architecture in France